Carla Thomas (born October 31, 1985) is a former professional basketball player for the Chicago Sky of the WNBA. She played a total of 17 games for the Sky in the 2007 season, averaging 2.5 points per game. 

In 2015 she was inducted into the Pennsylvania Sports Hall of Fame. 

In 2019, Thomas was inducted into the Vanderbilt University Athletics Hall of Fame, where she played for four years. A graduate of Cumberland Valley High School in Mechanicsburg, Pennsylvania, Thomas is one of the first women's basketball players to be drafted into the WNBA from the state of Pennsylvania.

Over the course of her athletic career she has won numerous individual and team accolades at the high school, collegiate, and professional levels.

Vanderbilt  statistics
Source

References

Hall of Fame Class Revealed
Local Sports: Nine included in PA Sports Hall of Fame

External links
Vanderbilt Commodores bio

1985 births
Living people
American women's basketball players
Basketball players from Pennsylvania
Centers (basketball)
Chicago Sky draft picks
Chicago Sky players
McDonald's High School All-Americans
Parade High School All-Americans (girls' basketball)
People from Mechanicsburg, Pennsylvania
Power forwards (basketball)
Vanderbilt Commodores women's basketball players